Gagilapur is a village located in Ranga Reddy district. It falls under Quthbullapur mandal.

Transport
The buses run by TSRTC connect it to different parts of the city.

References

Villages in Ranga Reddy district